E3 ubiquitin-protein ligase RFWD2 is an enzyme that in humans is encoded by the RFWD2 gene.

Interactions 

RFWD2 has been shown to interact with C-jun.

References

Further reading